The Naked Pumpkin Run is an annual event in certain United States municipalities where participants run a course through a town while nude, save for shoes and a carved pumpkin on their heads. Runs have been held in Boulder, Colorado, Seattle, Washington, Portland, Oregon, and Arcata, California.

History
The event can be traced to 1974 when hundreds of University of Colorado at Boulder students ran across the campus in the nude in a failed attempt to set a Guinness World Record.

Starting in 2001, scores of people took part in a Halloween run through Boulder's streets wearing only shoes and a hollowed-out pumpkin on their heads.

In 2008, 150 people ran naked for the 10th official annual Naked Pumpkin Run. 12 participants were arrested and charged with indecent exposure. In 2009, local police threatened participants with charges of indecent exposure and registration as a sex offender if they were arrested during the run. The few people who subsequently participated in the run wore enough clothing to avoid being arrested. In 2010, the Boulder city council passed a local ordinance prohibiting public nudity. Boulder's mayor said the city had ended the pumpkin run after it had attracted increasing numbers of participants. The American Civil Liberties Union argued in favor of the event.

Boulder also hosts an annual clothing-optional bike ride that protests the use of fossil fuels.

Runners in Hamilton, Ontario had their first Naked Pumpkin run on October 30, 2015. Ten runners participated in the inaugural event, without arrest or incident.

See also
Nude recreation
Turkey trot

References

External links
Naked Pumpkin Run.org

Clothing-free events
Culture of Boulder, Colorado